FAR was a French truck manufacturer, affiliated with Chenard-Walcker.

It was founded in 1919 and ceased manufacture in 1970.

History
André Lagache, winner of the inaugural 24 Hours of Le Mans in 1923 driving a Chenard Walcker, was one of the founders of Tracteurs FAR and was denoted by the "A" in FAR.

Products
Among the company's products was the 'Pony Mécanique', developed by the Napier motor company and improved in design by Oliver Danson North. It was a three-wheeled articulated tractor unit fitted with automatic coupling gear to enable rapid change of trailers. These vehicles were built under licence from UK company Scammell (Scammell Mechanical Horse) from 1937 to 1970, but the FAR production used the Citroën Traction Avant  engine.

References

  Chenard and Walcker-Far: The Vanished Empire of Gennevilliers (French) by Claude Rouxel, Jacques Dorizon & Marc Clouet

See also

Defunct truck manufacturers
Defunct motor vehicle manufacturers of France
Vehicle manufacturing companies established in 1919
Manufacturing companies disestablished in 1970